Nur (also spelled Noor, Nor, or Nour,) is a common Arabic unisex name meaning "light", "The Divine Light". An-Nur, meaning "the light" in Arabic. It can also be feminized as Nura or Noora.

In Norse mythology Nór was the name of the founder king of Norway.

In Dutch and Flemish Noor can be a form of Eleonore cognate to the English name Eleanor, the first bearer of which was Eleanor of Aquitaine and is probably Occitan in origin. Noor is also an Estonian language surname, meaning "young".

Given name

Noor
Queen Noor of Jordan, former Queen of Jordan
Noor Alam, Pakistani field hockey player
Princess Noor bint Asem (born 1982), of the Jordanian Royal Family
Noor Bukhari, Pakistani actress
Noor Muhammad Butt, Pakistani nuclear physicist
Noor Hassanali, former president of Trinidad and Tobago
Noor Jehan, Pakistani singer and actress
Noor Inayat Khan, Indian born British SOE agent
Princess Noor Pahlavi, Iranian princess
Noor Sabri, Iraqi footballer
Noor Islam Dawar, Pakistani Pashtun human rights activist

Nour
Nour El-Sherif, Egyptian actor
Nour (Marian Farid Abi Habib), Lebanese actress
Nour El-Sayed, Egyptian footballer
Nour Mansour, Lebanese footballer
Nour Mhanna, Syrian singer
Nour Ardakani, Lebanese singer and dancer

Nur
Politicians, statesmen, and royalty
Nur ibn Mujahid (reigned 1550-1567), 16th-century Somali Emir of Harar
Sultan Nur Ahmed Aman leader of the Habr Yunis clan
Nur Bekri, high ranked Chinese politician
Nur Alam, Indonesian governor of South East Sulawesi
Nur Hassan Wirajuda, former Indonesian minister of foreign affairs
Nur Ahmad Jan Bughra, Uighur Emir of the First East Turkestan Republic
Nur Jahan, Mughal Empress
Nur Devlet (reigned 1466-1469, 1475-1476), khan of the Crimean Khanate
Nursultan Abishuly Nazarbayev, first President of Kazakhstan

Intellectuals
Nur Yalman, Turkish anthropologist
Cak Nur, the nickname of Nurcholish Madjid, a prominent Indonesian Muslim intellectual
 Nur Ali Elahi, Iranian philosopher, jurist, and musician

Sportspeople
Cansu Nur Kaya (born 2000), Turkish women's footballer
Esma Nur Çakmak (born 2004), Turkish female arm wrestler
Gamze Nur Yaman (born 1999), Turkish women's footballer
Nur B. Ali, Pakistani-American racecar driver
Nur Mustafa Gülen (born 1960), Turkish footballer and coach
Nur Nurhan Çakmak, Turkish women's footballer
Büşra Nur Tırıklı (born 1994), Turkish Paralympian discus thrower
Merve Nur Eroğlu (born 1993), Turkish Paralympic archer
Nur Atikah Nabilah, Singaporean gymnast
Seda Nur İncik (born 2000), Turkish footballer
Şeyma Nur Emeksiz Bacaksız, Turkish Para Taekwondo practitioner

Other people
Nur Fettahoğlu, Turkish German actress
Nur Sürer, Turkish actress
Nur Hossain, Bangladeshi activist
Nur Khan, Pakistan Air Force officer

Surname
Ayman Nour (born 1964), Egyptian politician
Mohamed Mohamed Noor (born 1985), a United States police officer, convicted for the killing of Justine Damond
Mohamed Noor, American biologist and geneticist
Mohammed Noor (born 1978), Saudi Arabian footballer
Farah Nur (1862–1932), Somali poet and warrior 
Mariam Nour (born 1936), Lebanese television personality
Omar Nour (born 1978), Egyptian triathlete
Sabila Noor, Bangladeshi actress
Shajal Noor, Bangladeshi actor
Nur Ahmed Nur (born 1937), Afghan communist
Rıza Nur (1879–1942), Turkish surgeon
Viive Noor (born 1955), Estonian illustrator and curator
Yusuf Haji Nur, Somali politician

Fictional characters
Nour El Deen Mahmoud Nour El Deen, a fictional character in Malaf Al Mostakbal series
Nour, the central character in the spiritual Sufi text about the history of fire written by Ahmed El Bedawi; recently retold by Idries Shah
Nour, young boy in J. M. G. Le Clézio's novel Désert (novel)
En Sabah Nur (Apocalypse) is a fictional supervillain appearing in comic books published by Marvel Comics.
Noor Bauwens, a fictional character in the Belgian online series wtFOCK
Noor, a fictional female character from the Japanese series Nigoru Hitomi de Nani wo Negau: Highserk Senki

Arabic-based compound names with Nur as an element
Nurullah, that is Nur Allah, meaning light of God
Nur al-Din, that is Nur al-Din, meaning light of the religion/faith
Nur ul-Huda, that is Nur al-Huda, meaning light of the guidance
Nurul Islam, that is Nur al-Islam, meaning light of Islam
Nuruzzaman, that is Nur al-Zaman, meaning light of the era
Abdel Nour, that is Abd an-Nur, meaning servant of the Light
Nuri, meaning luminous or my light
Núria is an Arabic Catalan girl's name, meaning light

Notes

Arabic-language surnames
Arabic unisex given names
Turkish-language surnames
Turkish unisex given names
Pakistani unisex given names
Estonian-language surnames